Muhammad Tholchah Hasan (10 October 1938 in Tuban - 29 May 2019 in Malang) was an Indonesian Islamic cleric, academic, and politician who served as Minister of Religious Affairs.

References

1938 births
2019 deaths
Government ministers of Indonesia
People from Tuban